Physarum cinereum is a slime mold that grows on turfgrass or beet but is not a pathogen.

Taxonomy
The species was originally named Lycoperdon cinereum by August Johann Georg Karl Batsch in 1783; Christiaan Hendrik Persoon transferred it to Physarum in 1794.

References

Root vegetable diseases
Turfgrass diseases
Taxa named by August Batsch
Taxa named by Christiaan Hendrik Persoon
Physaraceae